Jack William Walker (born 8 August 1999) is an English professional rugby league footballer who plays as a  for Hull FC, on short-term loan from the Bradford Bulls in the Betfred Championship and the England Knights at international level.

Background
Walker was born in Leeds, West Yorkshire, England.

Club career
Walker made his début for Leeds in the Challenge Cup against Doncaster where he scored a hat trick. He made his first Super League début against Huddersfield. He then went on to become Leeds' first choice fullback and played in the Rhinos' 2017 Super League Grand Final victory over the Castleford Tigers 24-6 at Old Trafford.

International career
In 2018, Walker was selected to play for England Knights on their tour of Papua New Guinea. He played against Papua New Guinea at the Oil Search National Football Stadium.

Honours

Club
 Super League:
Winner: 2017

 World Club Challenge:
Runner up: 2018

References

External links
Leeds Rhinos profile
SL profile
Leeds Rhinos v Doncaster

1999 births
Living people
Bradford Bulls players
England Knights national rugby league team players
English rugby league players
Hull F.C. players
Leeds Rhinos players
Rugby league fullbacks
Rugby league players from Leeds